The men's 5000 metres at the 2022 European Athletics Championships took place at the Olympiastadion on 17 August.

Records

Schedule

Results
The start on 21:08.

References

5000 M
5000 metres at the European Athletics Championships